The 2008 Trophée des Champions Final was a football match that saw the 2007–08 Ligue 1 and Coupe de France champions Lyon face off against Bordeaux. Since Lyon won both the league and the Coupe de France, they faced the club that finished in second place in Ligue 1 this past season, Bordeaux.

The match was held on 2 August 2008 at the Stade Chaban-Delmas in Bordeaux. After the score finished in a 0–0 draw after 90 minutes, Bordeaux ended Lyon's streak of six-straight Trophée des Champions titles by defeating them 5–4 on penalties.

Match details

See also
2008–09 Ligue 1

References

External links
Match Statistics

Trophee des champions
Trophée des Champions
Trophee des champions 2008
Trophee des champions 2008
Trophee des Champions 2008
Trophee des Champions
Sport in Bordeaux